Kentucky Route 1968 (KY 1968), known locally as Parkers Mill Road, is a secondary state highway located entirely in western Fayette County in East Central Kentucky. The  mainly traverses the western suburbs of Lexington.

Route description 
KY 1968 begins and ends with junctions with Versailles Road (US 60) on the west side of Lexington. KY 1968's only major junction is with the Man o' War Boulevard. The Blue Grass Airport is accessible from the route via Airport Road.

Major intersections

References

1968
1968